General elections were held in Malawi on 27 and 28 May 1987. As the country had become a one-party state in 1966, the Malawi Congress Party was the sole legal party at the time. The number of seats in the National Assembly was increased to 112, whilst President-for-life Hastings Banda was able to appoint as many additional members as he saw fit to "enhance the representative character of the Assembly, or to represent particular minority or other special interests in the Republic."

In total, over 200 candidates contested the seats, although in 38 there was only a single MCP candidate, who was elected unopposed. In the remaining 80 seats there were between two and five candidates, all of which were for the MCP. Banda appointed a further 11 members.

Results

References

1987 in Malawi
Elections in Malawi
One-party elections
Malawi
May 1987 events in Africa
Election and referendum articles with incomplete results